The GAA Minor Star Footballer of the Year is a gaelic football award presented annually by the sport's governing body, the Gaelic Athletic Association, to the player deemed the best in the All-Ireland Minor Championship. The award, created in 2017, is part of the wider GAA Minor Star Awards. The award is sponsored by Electric Ireland.

Winners

References

2017 establishments in Ireland
Awards established in 2017
Gaelic football awards